Joel Font Coma  (born December 21, 1966) is an Andorran politician. He is a member of the Liberal Party of Andorra, and served as Minister of Economy and Agriculture from 2005 to 2009.

References

1966 births
Living people
Liberal Party of Andorra politicians
Government ministers of Andorra
Place of birth missing (living people)
21st-century Andorran politicians